Feeling Orange but Sometimes Blue is the second studio album by American singer-songwriter Ledisi. The album won for Outstanding Jazz Album at the 2003 California Music Awards.

Track listing
"So Right" (Ledisi Young, Sundra Manning, Nelson Braxton)
"I've Got It"
"Sugar / Brown Sugar"
"Meeting Marcus on a Thursday"
"'Round Midnight" (Thelonious Monk, Bernie Hanighen, Cootie Williams)
"Straight No Chaser"
"Feeling Orange but Sometimes Blue"
"In a Sentimental Mood" (Duke Ellington, Irving Mills, Manny Kurtz)
"If You Go"
"Autumn Leaves (Les feuilles mortes)" (Joseph Kosma, Jacques Prévert, Johnny Mercer)
"Land of the Free"
"Autumn Leaves" (hidden track)

References

2002 albums
Ledisi albums